Azoulay v R, [1952] 2 S.C.R. 495 was a decision by the Supreme Court of Canada on abortion in Canada. The court found that with evidence so complicated, a judge should summarize it to a jury.

Background
Dr. Leon Azoulay was accused of murder after one of his patients died.  This woman, described by Justice James Wilfred Estey as "Mrs. P.", had allegedly received an abortion from Azoulay which wound up causing a fatal haemorrhage.  An autopsy revealed evidence of an abortion.

At trial, the judge spoke about the law under which Azoulay was charged, and told the jury that if they found Azoulay guilty, there must be evidence beyond a reasonable doubt.  He also declined to summarize the facts of the case, saying that they "have been well elaborated by the Defence and the Crown." Azoulay was found guilty of manslaughter.  Quebec's court of appeal upheld the conviction, albeit with the Chief Justice dissenting that the trial judge's discussion with the jury was inadequate.

Decision
The Supreme Court overturned the trial. Justice Robert Taschereau wrote an opinion saying he could imagine that there was sufficient evidence to convict Azoulay.  However, he agreed with the dissenting Chief Justice in the lower court that the trial judge "failed to instruct properly the jury, in omitting to review the evidence." Taschereau pointed to Spencer v. Alaska Parkers (1905) to say precedent had been established that judges should help guide the jury in giving "value and effect" to certain pieces of evidence.  Thus, needless details were not discarded, and the jury was "left in a state of confusion."

Justice James Wilfred Estey, in his opinion, wrote that the evidence in this case was "technical and somewhat involved," and that made it all the more necessary that a judge should help summarize the facts and distinguish important evidence from needless details.  In particular, he found that the defence arguments were not adequately presented.

Dissent
Two dissents were written by Justices Ivan Rand and Gérald Fauteux.  Rand wrote that the defence was not actually complex, and the facts were generally accepted.  For a judge to summarize the defence's arguments would have been redundant after a simple point had been repeated and explored many times.

Fauteux wrote that if the trial judge had summarized the expert testimony, this would work against rather than favour the defence's case.

See also
 List of Supreme Court of Canada cases (Richards Court through Fauteux Court)
 Morgentaler v R
 R v Morgentaler
 R v Morgentaler (1993)
 Tremblay v Daigle

References

External links
 

1952 in Canadian case law
Canadian abortion case law
Canadian criminal procedure case law
Supreme Court of Canada cases